Euxoa trifasciata is a moth of the family Noctuidae. It is found in North America, including Oregon, Washington, Colorado and California.

External links
Images

Euxoa
Moths of North America
Moths described in 1888